Elections to Dover District Council in Kent, England were held on 1 May 2003. This was on the same day as other UK local elections. The whole council was up for election and the council remained under no overall control.

References

Dover District Council elections
2003 English local elections
2000s in Kent